Halfway is a village in County Cork, in Ireland. Halfway got its name from being situated approximately halfway between Cork City and Bandon.

Halfway is situated on the L2231, just off the N71, close to the neighbouring village of Ballinhassig. Ballinhassig Garda station is located in Halfway. Halfway formerly had two pubs; however, there is now only the Ramble Inn pub. There is also an angling shop.

The annual Halfway Vintage Rally, a meeting of vintage car owners and enthusiasts, takes place over one weekend in September. Road bowling is sometimes played on the national road between the villages of Halfway and Ballinhassig.

Evidence of ancient settlement in the area includes several ringforts in the neighbouring townlands of Gortnaclogh, Annagh Beg and Rathroe.

See also
 List of towns and villages in Ireland

References

Towns and villages in County Cork